"Only the Lonely (Know the Way I Feel)" is a 1960 song written by Roy Orbison and Joe Melson. Orbison's recording of the song, produced by Fred Foster for Monument Records, was the first major hit for the singer. It was described by The New York Times as expressing "a clenched, driven urgency". Released as a 45 rpm single by Monument Records in May 1960, "Only the Lonely" went to No. 2 on the United States Billboard pop music charts on 25 July 1960 (blocked by Brenda Lee's "I'm Sorry") and No. 14 on the Billboard R&B charts. "Only the Lonely" reached number one in the United Kingdom, a position it achieved on 20 October 1960, staying there for two weeks (out of a total of 24 weeks spent on the UK singles chart from 28 July 1960). According to The Authorized Roy Orbison, "Only the Lonely" was the longest charting single of Orbison's career. Personnel on the original recording included Orbison's drummer Larry Parks, plus Nashville's regulars, Floyd Cramer on piano, Bob Moore on bass, and Hank Garland and Harold Bradley on guitars, Joe Melson and the Anita Kerr Singers on backing vocals. Drummer Buddy Harman played on the rest of the songs on the session.

Development
After several years without much success in the music business, and sharing a tiny apartment with his wife and new baby, Roy Orbison had taken to sitting in his car to write songs when, in 1958, his acquaintance Joe Melson tapped on the car window and suggested they collaborate. With Chet Atkins producing, they recorded several songs for RCA Nashville, only two of which were deemed worthy of release. Wesley Rose brought Orbison to the attention of producer Fred Foster at Monument Records. There, Orbison would become one of the first recording artists to popularize the "Nashville sound".

In his first session for Monument in Nashville, Orbison recorded "Paper Boy" (a song that RCA had previously refused) while sound engineer Bill Porter experimented with close miking the doo-wop backing singers. Orbison requested a string section to perform in the studio, to augment the Nashville sound. The resulting recording had a "polished, professional sound ... finally allow[ing] Orbison's stylistic inclinations free rein". With this combination, Orbison recorded three new songs, the most notable of which was "Uptown". Impressed with the results, Melson later recalled, "We stood in the studio, listening to the playbacks, and thought it was the most beautiful sound in the world." However, "Uptown" only reached number 72 on the Billboard Top 100, and Orbison set his sights on negotiating a contract with an upscale nightclub somewhere.

In early 1960, Orbison and Joe Melson wrote one more song, "Only the Lonely", which they tried to sell to Elvis Presley and the Everly Brothers, who turned it down. (The song was subtitled "Know The Way I Feel" to avoid confusion with another song called "Only The Lonely", which Sammy Cahn and Jimmy Van Heusen had written for Frank Sinatra in 1958.)

Instead, they recorded "Only the Lonely" themselves at RCA's Nashville studio, using the string section and doo-wop backing singers that had given "Uptown" such an impressive sound. But this time, sound engineer Bill Porter tried a completely new strategy: building the mix from the top down rather than from the bottom up, beginning with close-miked backing vocals in the foreground, and ending with the rhythm section soft in the background. This combination was to become Orbison's trademark sound.

The recording also featured a falsetto note hit by Orbison that showcased a surprisingly powerful voice. According to biographer Alan Clayson, it "came not from his throat but deeper within". The song differed from the typical verse-chorus form structure of popular music of the time, building and falling to a climax, with emotional expression then rare for masculine performance.

The single shot to number two on the Billboard Hot 100 and hit number one in the UK, Ireland and Australia. According to Orbison, he and Melson now began constructing songs with Orbison's voice in mind, specifically to showcase its range and power. He told Rolling Stone in 1988, "I liked the sound of [my voice]. I liked making it sing, making the voice ring, and I just kept doing it. And I think that somewhere between the time of "Ooby Dooby" and "Only the Lonely", it kind of turned into a good voice." Instantly Orbison was in high demand. He appeared on American Bandstand and toured the U.S. for three months non-stop with Patsy Cline. When Presley heard "Only the Lonely" for the first time, the song he had turned down, he bought a box of the records to give out to his friends.

Cover versions
In 1969, country singer Sonny James recorded the song and had a number-one hit on the Billboard country music charts.

In popular culture
Orbison's version of his song has been used in motion pictures, including The Love Letter (1999) and Only the Lonely (1991).
 Bruce Springsteen referred to the song in his 1975 song "Thunder Road", and when inducting Orbison into the Rock and Roll Hall of Fame in 1987, Springsteen said, "In '75, when I went into the studio to make Born to Run, I wanted to make a record with words like Bob Dylan that sounded like Phil Spector, but most of all I wanted to sing like Roy Orbison." Springsteen originally intended to begin his album with an alarm clock followed by Orbison's song playing over the radio.

References

External links
 Roy Orbison - Only the Lonely at Metrolyrics

1960 singles
1960s ballads
1969 singles
UK Singles Chart number-one singles
Roy Orbison songs
Glen Campbell songs
Pop standards
Sonny James songs
Grammy Hall of Fame Award recipients
Songs about loneliness
Songs written by Roy Orbison
Songs written by Joe Melson
The Flying Pickets songs
Monument Records singles
Song recordings produced by Fred Foster
1960 songs